Linden Hall at Saint James Park is a historic estate and national historic district located at Lower Tyrone Township, Fayette County, Pennsylvania. The district includes three contributing buildings, one contributing structure, and one contributing object. The mansion was built by Sarah B. Cochran between 1909 and 1911, and is a 2 1/2-story, stone and stucco dwelling in the Tudor Revival style. The mansion has 31 rooms and is in the shape of a crescent. It is atop a hill at a  elevation that affords a panoramic view of the surrounding area. Also on the property are the contributing garage and chauffeur's residence, gardens, and pool pavilion. It was a private residence until 1944, when it was sold to the Order of Saint Basil the Great as a novitiate. In 1957, it was sold to the St. James Country Club, and the property was developed as a country club in the 1960s and 1970s.  It was sold to the United Steelworkers in 1976.

It was added to the National Register of Historic Places in 1998.

See also
 Sarah B. Cochran

External links
Design for window for Sarah Cochran, Linden Hall, Dawson, Pennsylvania (Collection of Metropolitan Museum of Art)

References

Houses on the National Register of Historic Places in Pennsylvania
Historic districts on the National Register of Historic Places in Pennsylvania
Tudor Revival architecture in Pennsylvania
Houses completed in 1911
Houses in Fayette County, Pennsylvania
National Register of Historic Places in Fayette County, Pennsylvania